Graham Lusk FRS(For) FRSE (February 15, 1866 - July 18, 1932) was an American physiologist, and nutritionist.  He graduated from Columbia University, and from University of Munich with a PhD. He was an expert on diabetes. He was profoundly deaf from the age of 30.

Early life
He was born in Bridgeport, Connecticut on February 15, 1866, the son of Prof. William Thompson Lusk of Long Island College of Medicine and his wife, Mary Hartwell Chittenden. His maternal grandfather was U.S. Representative Simeon B. Chittenden.

He studied at Columbia School of Mines, graduating M.A. in 1887. He did further postgraduate studies in Germany under Professor Carl Voit at the University of Munich gaining a doctorate (Ph.D.) in 1891.

Career
In 1892, he began assisting in lectures at Yale Medical School and in 1895 became Professor of Physiology there.

In 1898, he moved to Bellevue Hospital, New York City and in 1909 to Cornell University where he remained until death.  His papers are held at Cornell University.

In 1899 (largely due to his father's Scottish roots), he was elected a Fellow of the Royal Society of Edinburgh. His proposers were Diarmid Noel Paton, John Clarence Webster, Sir John Batty Tuke and Alexander Bruce. In 1932 he was also elected a Foreign Fellow of the Royal Society of London.

He retired in 1931.

Personal life
In 1899, he married Mary Woodbridge Tiffany, a daughter of Louis Comfort Tiffany. Together, they were the parents of:

William Tiffany Lusk (1901-1978), who married Katharine Adams.
Louise Tiffany Lusk (1902-1994), who married Collier Platt.
Louis Tiffany Lusk (1906-1969), who married Eloise Prentice.

Lusk died in New York on July 18, 1932.

Selected publications
The Elements of the Science of Nutrition (1906, 1917)
History of Nutrition (unfinished at death)

References

External links

Food in War Time by Graham Lusk - Free eBook
National Academy of Sciences Biographical Memoir

1866 births
1932 deaths
American diabetologists
American nutritionists
Columbia School of Mines alumni
American deaf people
Dietitians
Fellows of the Royal Society of Edinburgh
Foreign Members of the Royal Society
Scientists with disabilities